Holocacista selastis is a moth of the family Heliozelidae. It was described by Edward Meyrick in 1926. It is found in India.

The larvae feed on Psychotria dalzelii.

References

Moths described in 1926
Heliozelidae